Subin Limbu was crowned Miss Nepal in 2014 at an event held at Army Officers’ Club in Kathmandu. Former Miss Nepal Ishani Shrestha crowned her Miss Nepal 2014. The event was organized by Hidden Treasure and sponsored by Fanta.

Limbu, selected from 18 finalists, was crowned by Miss Nepal 2013 Ishani Shrestha. Likewise, Pranayana KC has announced Miss Personality, Soni Raj Bhandari Miss Nepal International, and Prinsa Shrestha Miss Nepal Earth.

References

External links
YouTube.com
YouTube.com

Living people
People from Dharan
Miss Nepal winners
Nepalese female models
Nepalese beauty pageant winners
Limbu people
1991 births
Miss World 2014 delegates